Pasión y poder (English: Passion and Power), is a Mexican telenovela produced by Carlos Sotomayor for Televisa in 1988.

Starring Diana Bracho, Enrique Rocha, Carlos Bracho and Claudia Islas.

Plot 
The soap opera revolves around the family dramas and business powers of two rival families. That rivalry that has endured for years have originated many years ago, when Arturo Montenegro and Eladio Gómez Luna disputed the love of the beautiful Ana Laura. Eladio was who married her. Many years later Ana Laura is a very unhappy woman because it supports the abuses and the wickedness of her husband, taking as the only consolation the love of his son Federico, a total antithesis of his father.

Cast 
Diana Bracho as Ana Laura
Enrique Rocha as Eladio
Carlos Bracho as Arturo
Claudia Islas as Nina
Paulina Rubio as Paulina
Lola Merino as Ana Karen
Alejandro Landero as Federico
Patricia Rivera as Patricia
Mariagna Prats as Alicia
Constantino Costas as Rogelio
Miguel Pizarro as Pedro
Martín Barraza as Ariel
Juan Carlos Muñoz as Jaime
Antonio Brillas as José
César Castro as Leonardo
Ernesto Vilches as Ibarra
Emilio Guerrero as Morales
Ivette Proal as Marina
Gustavo Navarro as Carlos
Pilar Escalante as Raquel
Xavier Ximénez as Anselmo
Patricia Lukin as Vanessa
Delia Casanova as Soledad
Yolanda Mérida as Rosario

Awards and nominations

References

External links 

1988 telenovelas
1988 Mexican television series debuts
1988 Mexican television series endings
Mexican telenovelas
Televisa telenovelas
Spanish-language telenovelas